Collinstown is an unincorporated community in Stokes County, North Carolina, United States.

Jessup's Mill was listed on the National Register of Historic Places in 1982.

References

Unincorporated communities in Stokes County, North Carolina
Unincorporated communities in North Carolina